Corsyra fusula is a species of beetle in the family Carabidae, the only species in the genus Corsyra.

References

Lebiinae